The 20th Arabian Gulf Cup was the twentieth edition of the biannual Gulf Cup competition, and took place in Aden, Yemen, from 22 November to 5 December 2010. The tournament was held in Yemen for the first time in the tournament's history, and this edition celebrated the 40th anniversary of the cup as well as the 20th anniversary of the tournament.

The opening match was played between the host Yemen and Saudi Arabia at the 22 May Stadium in Aden.

Kuwait won the tournament for the tenth time in the team's history, against 2-time consecutive second-place finishers, Saudi Arabia in a 1–0 score that ended with extra time.

Teams
8 teams participated in the tournament.

  (Host)
  (Holder)

Venues

Competition mascot
The competition mascot (rather a secondary competition logo) depicts a Yemeni juggling a football in a traditional Yemeni  while wearing headgear consisting of colors from the Yemeni flag.

The design has been featured in many advertising campaigns for the competition as well as many talk-shows, and has emerged as a well-known symbol for the competition, even more so than the primary competition logo.

The draw
The draw for the tournament was held on 22 August 2010.
 Eight teams were divided into two groups, Yemen (The host nation) was in group A, Oman (The holder) in group B, while the rest of the teams were placed in a pot based on August 2010's FIFA rankings.

Seedings

Squads

Group stage
All times are Yemen Time – UTC+3

Group A

Group B

Knockout stage

Semi-finals

Final

Winners

Goalscorers

3 goals
 Alaa Abdul-Zahra
 Badr Al-Mutawa
2 goals
 Hawar Mulla Mohammed
 Jaralla Al-Marri
1 goal
 Faouzi Mubarak Aaish
 Ismail Abdul-Latif
 Ibrahim Al-Mishkhas
 Abdulla Baba Fatadi
 Jarah Al Ateeqi
 Yousef Nasser
 Fahad Al Enezi
 Waleed Ali
 Imad Al-Hosni

1 goal (cont.)
 Ibrahim Al-Ghanim
 Ahmad Abbas
 Osama Al-Muwallad
 Mohammad Al-Shalhoub
 Muhannad Assiri
 Mishaal Al Saeed
 Subait Khater
 Fares Juma Al Saadi
 Ahmed Juma
 Akram Al-Worafi

Own goals
 Hamed Shami Zaher (for Saudi Arabia)

Team statistics
This table shows all team performance.

Total goals by team

7 goals 

 6 goals 

 5 goals 

 4 goal 

 3 goal 

 1 goal

Trivia

 For the first time in the tournament's history all matches were played on artificial grass fields.
 The broadcasting rights for the tournament was sold for the highest price ever in Gulf Cup history to Abu Dhabi Sports in a deal worth 560 million dollars.
 For the third consecutive time previous champions of the tournament failed to pass the group stages after 2009 winners, Oman failed to qualify to the final four.
 Ali Al-Habsi's record for 4 consecutive "Best Tournament Goalkeeper" was broken after Kuwait's Nawaf Al-Khaldi won the award due to Ali's absence in the competition.

References

External links
Official website
Gulf Cup site
Gulf Cup site

2010
2010 in Asian football
International association football competitions hosted by Yemen
2010–11 in Yemeni football
2010–11 in Omani football
2010–11 in Bahraini football
2010–11 in Saudi Arabian football
2010–11 in Emirati football
2010–11 in Kuwaiti football
2010–11 in Iraqi football
2010–11 in Qatari football